Batonga may refer to:
 Tonga people of Malawi
 Tonga people of Zambia and Zimbabwe
 The Batonga Foundation, for adolescent girls in sub-Saharan Africa
 "Batonga", a 1991 song by Angélique Kidjo

See also
 Batong (disambiguation)